Waso (formerly Nweta or Myayta (Old Burmese: မ္လယ်တာ (မြေတာ)) is the fourth month of the traditional Burmese calendar.

Festivals and observances
Dhammacakka Day - full moon of Waso
Beginning of the Buddhist Lent

Waso symbols
Flower: Jasminum grandiflorum

See also
Burmese calendar
Festivals of Burma
Vassa

References

Months of the Burmese calendar